Learning Through Art is an educational program of the Solomon R. Guggenheim Museum. LTA pairs practicing artists with participating public elementary school classrooms throughout the five boroughs of New York City. These resident artists spend one day a week for a period of 10 or 20 weeks working with classroom instructors to create and execute an art curriculum for the students that ties in with current Guggenheim exhibitions and supports the core curriculum learning inside of the classroom. Participating classrooms visit the Guggenheim multiple times throughout the duration of their program, and student artwork is shown in a culminating exhibition at the Guggenheim Museum in their annual A Year With Children showcase.

History
In 1970, in response to the cutting of art and music programs in New York City public schools, Natalie K. Lieberman started a program called Learning to Read Through the Arts. Later becoming a Guggenheim trustee, in 1994 the program was merged with the Guggenheim Foundation. In its first 35 years, LTA has worked with hundreds of resident artists to serve approximately 138,500 New York City schoolchildren in dozens of public schools.

Methods
At the core of the LTA philosophy is the belief that artwork can, and, in today's image-saturated culture, should, be taught to be read much like a traditional text. Teaching students to talk about art the way they would talk about text gives them a forum to practice critical-thinking skills and become active participants in a work, be that work visual or text based. Unlike text, however, works of art provide a highly accessible way for students to practice these necessary reading skills without having to worry about stumbling over a difficult word, flip through pages to find a quote, or struggle with decoding written text.

Additionally, it may be easier to find visual artworks open to a wide array of interpretation - thus lending themselves to be contoured more easily towards a specific teaching point (es: mood) while at the same time inviting more varied discussion from students. This is because we as a culture have grown familiar with abstract art, abstract expressionism and surrealism for example, whereas we remain extremely uncomfortable with literature that approaches abstraction.

Critical-thinking skills are developed through open-ended questions and conversations between instructor and student. This practice is called Inquiry. Questions such as: "What do you notice about this painting? What can we guess about this place? Compare this place to your own neighborhood. How is it similar? How is it different?" are similar to the kinds of conversations that would take place around text in the classroom. Students are asked to back up their interpretations of the artwork with explanations of details in the piece that lead them to their conclusion; multiple interpretations of the work are encouraged by discussion facilitators, such as "Does everyone agree? Are there any other ideas?" Through inquiry, students not only develop visual literacy skills that transfer to textual literacies, but an important groundwork is laid in the grammar and value of group discussion.

Literacy skills
In 2006, results of a three-year study confirmed fundamental literacy skills were developed through participation in inquiry with art. The study, Teaching Literacy Through Art, was administered by the LTA program, conducted by Randi Korn & Associates, and funded by the U.S. Department of Education. The study examined groups of third graders at P.S. 148 in Queens, and P.S. 86 in the Bronx. Along with classroom discussion of texts and visual documents, for the purposes of this study students were asked to discuss the painting The Artist and His Mother by Arshile Gorky (1926), and an excerpt from Cynthia Kabohata's 2004 book Kira-Kira. The study found that the third grade students who participated in the LTA program and had ample practice talking critically about works of art using inquiry, used more words to express themselves and demonstrated higher achievement in six categories of literacy and critical-thinking skills than their peers who had no experience with inquiry and visual documents. Categories of improved literacy skills were: thorough description, extended focus, hypothesizing, evidential reasoning, providing multiple interpretations, and building schema.

These improvements in critical-thinking skills aid classroom teachers in meeting New York State English Language Arts Learning Standards, and prove that skills learned while creating meaning with a visual document are transferable to students' capabilities in navigating meaning with a written text.
For many students who have trouble decoding text, talking critically about a visual text provides a more accessible entryway to developing these important critical-thinking skills necessary in becoming an active reader of written texts.

However, while students who participated in LTA demonstrated improved critical-thinking and literacy skills inside the classroom and in interviews with researchers, scores on the New York City English Language Arts exam were not significantly different from the control group. This could perhaps be because the exam was written, whereas inquiry with artwork and data collected for research was done orally, through class discussion and interviews. Oral evaluations were chosen to be used in the study, because researchers wanted to evaluate students' language skills when thinking critically about a work of art or a text, as opposed to students' reading or writing ability.

A visual world
The research results of LTA's Teaching Literacy Through Art study are not only good news for art educators looking to prove what they've instinctually known, that making and looking at artwork widens students' perspectives of the world. The study also strengthens the new trend in the education field of multi-modal texts in classrooms. Multi-modal classrooms acknowledge the fact that we live in a world where students are barraged with many types of "texts," not only traditional print texts such as novels and poems, but other kinds of print media and online texts. Increasingly, these texts reach us visually, through movies and television programs and commercials, billboards, and printed advertisements using photographs, drawings, and graphic design. The Learning Through Art program teaches students to look at these visual texts with critical eye, and, through the creation of their own artwork, empowers students to become not only passive consumers of this visual culture, but also creators and manipulators of it.

See also
 Visual literacy
 Visual literacy in education

Footnotes

References
 Kennedy, Randy. Guggenheim Study Suggests Arts Education Benefits Literacy Skills. June 26, 2006. New York Times. https://www.nytimes.com/2006/07/27/books/27gugg.html
 RK&A's Final Teaching Literacy Through Art Report. http://media.guggenheim.org/lta/pdfs/Executive_Summary_and_Discussion.pdf
 The National Council of Teachers of English. https://web.archive.org/web/20080625031558/http://www.ncte.org/edpolicy/multimodal

External links
 The Learning Through Art page on the Guggenheim Website

Solomon R. Guggenheim Foundation
Learning programs